1798 in philosophy

Events

Publications 
 Immanuel Kant's Anthropology from a Pragmatic Point of View (1798)
 Thomas Robert Malthus's An Essay on the Principle of Population (1798)

Births 
 February 17 - Friedrich Eduard Beneke (died 1854)
 February 19 - Auguste Comte (died 1857)
 April 7 - Pierre Leroux (died 1871)
 May 9 - Augustin Bonnetty (died 1879)
 June 29 - Giacomo Leopardi (died 1837)
 December 20 - Laurens Perseus Hickok (died 1888)
 December 29 - Barzillai Quaife (died 1873)

Deaths 
 December 1 - Michael Gottlieb Birckner (born 1756)
 May 28 - James Dunbar (born 1742)
 June 24 - Rigas Feraios (born 1757)
 December 1 - Christian Garve (born 1742)

References 

Philosophy
18th-century philosophy
Philosophy by year